Alison Brysk (born March 8, 1960) is an American political scientist who holds the Mellichamp Chair in Global Governance, Global and International Studies, at the University of California, Santa Barbara, specializing in international Human Rights.

Brysk attended Pomona College received a master's degree in political science and a Ph.D. in political science, both from Stanford University. Her doctoral thesis was "The political impact of Argentina's human rights movement: social movements, transition and democratization." Brysk has taught at University of New Mexico, Pomona, Stanford, Lund University in Sweden, and the University of California, Irvine. She currently teaches at the University of California, Santa Barbara in the Global and International Studies department, offering courses on human rights, international relations, civil society, and Latin American politics at both the graduate and undergraduate level. Additionally, Brysk has been a visiting scholar and lecturer in Argentina, Australia, Ecuador, France, Spain, Germany, Sweden, the Netherlands, South Africa, Hungary, and Japan. In 2011, Brysk was the Fulbright Senior Scholar at Ravenshaw University in India, and in 2007 she held the Fulbright Distinguished Visiting Chair in Global Governance at Canada's CIGI.

Brysk was a fellow at the Woodrow Wilson International Center for Scholars in Washington, D.C. for the 2013-2014 academic year, where she completed a project called "Women's Rights as Human Rights: Constructing Political Will." Brysk is an officer of both the American Political Science Association and the International Studies Association. She has been published in a range of academic journals, including Comparative Political Studies, Human Rights Quarterly, and Polity.

References

External links
 Official biography at University of California

Living people
American women political scientists
American political scientists
University of California, Santa Barbara faculty
Pomona College alumni
Stanford University alumni
1960 births
21st-century American women